Away We a Go-Go is a 1966 album by Smokey Robinson & the Miracles. The album features the singles "(Come 'Round Here) I'm the One You Need", a Billboard top 20 Pop hit, written and produced by Holland-Dozier-Holland; and "Whole Lot of Shakin' in My Heart (Since I Met You)", written and produced by Frank Wilson. The album uses a different take of "I'm the One You Need" than what was issued on the single. A third single was planned for release from this album, the tune "More, More, More (of Your Love)", cataloged as Tamla T-54005, but the single was never released. It was later covered by the regional group Bob Brady and The Con Chords. Another single from this album, the Stevie Wonder/Ivy Jo Hunter composition of "Can You Love a Poor Boy", was released to radio stations as a special Disc Jockey Advanced Single, Tamla T-540, but was never given an official catalog number for general release. It too, inspired cover versions by Gil Bernal and Ronnie Walker.

Also featured are covers of contemporary hits, among them the Temptations' "Beauty Is Only Skin Deep" (which the Miracles actually recorded in 1964, some two years before the Temptations did), Dusty Springfield's "You Don't Have to Say You Love Me, and two Dionne Warwick songs, "Walk On By" and "Don't Know What to Do with Myself".The original ballad, "Baby Baby", was composed by Motown staff songwriters and recording artists the Lewis Sisters who had also written songs for other Motown artists, including Marvin Gaye, Gladys Knight & the Pips, Brenda Holloway, and Martha & the Vandellas. Although not pictured on the cover (or on any Miracles album covers since 1963's The Fabulous Miracles), original Miracles member Claudette Robinson is pictured with the group on this album's back cover. Away We a Go-Go was originally released on CD in 1992, and was re-released in 2002 in a Motown two-fer set with the Miracles' 1965 album Going to a Go-Go.

Track listing

Side one
 "Whole Lot of Shakin' in My Heart (Since I Met You)" (Frank Wilson)
 "You Don't Have to Say You Love Me" (Pino Donaggio, Simon Napier-Bell, Vicki Wickham, Vito Pallavicini)
 "(Come 'Round Here) I'm the One You Need" (Holland-Dozier-Holland)
 "Save Me" (Smokey Robinson, Robert Rogers, Warren Moore)
 "Oh Be My Love" (Robinson, Moore)
 "Can You Love a Poor Boy" (Ivy Jo Hunter, Stevie Wonder)

Side two
 "Beauty Is Only Skin Deep" (Norman Whitfield, Edward Holland, Jr.)
 "I Just Don't Know What to Do with Myself" (Burt Bacharach, Hal David)
 "Baby Baby" (Helen Lewis, Kay Lewis)
 "Walk On By" (Burt Bacharach, Hal David)
 "Swept for You Baby" (Robinson)
 "More, More, More of Your Love" (Robinson)

Personnel

The Miracles
 Smokey Robinson – lead vocals
 Ronnie White – background vocals
Bobby Rogers – background vocals
Warren "Pete" Moore – background vocals
Claudette Robinson – background vocals
 Marv Tarplin – guitarist

Other credits
 Smokey Robinson – producer ("Save Me", "Oh Be My Love", "Swept For You Baby", "More, More, More of Your Love")
 Mickey Gentile – producer "You Don't Have to Say You Love Me", "I Just Don't Know What to Do with Myself", "Walk On By"
 Brian Holland – producer "(Come 'Round Here) I'm the One You Need"
 Lamont Dozier – producer "(Come 'Round Here) I'm the One You Need"
 Frank Wilson – producer "Whole Lot of Shakin' in My Heart (Since I Met You)", "Baby Baby"
 Ivy Jo Hunter – producer "Can You Love a Poor Boy"
 Norman Whitfield – producer "Beauty is Only Skin Deep"
 The Funk Brothers and various New York session musicians: instrumentation

References

External links
 The Miracles - Away We a Go-Go rear cover
 Dusty Groove album review

1966 albums
The Miracles albums
Tamla Records albums
Albums produced by Norman Whitfield
Albums produced by Smokey Robinson
Albums produced by Frank Wilson (musician)
Albums produced by Ivy Jo Hunter
Albums produced by Brian Holland
Albums produced by Lamont Dozier
Albums recorded at Hitsville U.S.A.